Elinor Whitney Field (1889–1980) was an American writer of children's books.  Her book Tod of the Fens was published in 1928 and was the recipient of a Newbery Honor. She and Bertha Mahony founded The Horn Book Magazine, the oldest U.S magazine dedicated to reviewing children's literature.

Works
 Tyke-y: His Book and His Mark
 Tod, of the fens (1928)
 Realms of gold in children's books (1929) (with Bertha Mahony)
 Contemporary illustrators of children's books (1930) (with Betha Mahony)
 Try all ports, 1933
 Five Years of Children's Books (1936) (with Betha Mahony)
 Illustrators of Children's Books, 1744-1945 (1947)
 Writing and Criticism: A Book for Margery Bianco (1951)
 Newbery medal books, 1922-1955, with their author's acceptance papers & related material chiefly from the Horn book magazine (1955) (with Bertha Mahony)
 Caldecott medal books, 1938-1957, with the artists' acceptance papers & related material chiefly from the Horn book magazine (1957) (with Bertha Mahony)
 Horn book reflections on children's books and reading; selected from eighteen years of the Horn book magazine, 1949-1966 (1969)

References

1889 births
1980 deaths
American children's writers